Papu Diocabre Mendes (born 1 October 2000) is a Bissau-Guinean professional footballer who plays as a midfielder for Servette in the Swiss Super League.

Career
A youth product of Strasbourg, Mendes began his career with their reserves in the Championnat National 3. He transferred to Servette in Switzerland on 22 June 2021. He made his professional debut with Servette in a 3–0 UEFA Europa Conference League loss to Molde on 22 July 2021.

International career
Born in Guinea Bissau, Mendes holds a Portuguese passport and was called up to train with the Portugal U19s in 2019.

References

External links
 
 SFL Profile
 

2000 births
Sportspeople from Bissau
Bissau-Guinean footballers
Portuguese footballers
Portuguese people of Bissau-Guinean descent
Living people
Association football midfielders
RC Strasbourg Alsace players
Servette FC players
Championnat National 3 players
Swiss Super League players
2. Liga Interregional players
Bissau-Guinean expatriate footballers
Portuguese expatriate footballers
Expatriate footballers in Switzerland
Bissau-Guinean expatriate sportspeople in Switzerland
Portuguese expatriate sportspeople in Switzerland